Hamlet (also Telmat) is an unincorporated community in Marin County, California.

A post office operated at Hamlet from 1876 to 1886. The Telmat post office operated from 1917 to 1931.

References

Unincorporated communities in California
Unincorporated communities in Marin County, California
Populated coastal places in California